Janus integer, the currant stem girdler, is a species of stem sawfly in the family Cephidae.

References

Cephidae
Articles created by Qbugbot